Tarhos is a village in Békés County, in the Southern Great Plain region of south-east Hungary.

The settlement belonged to the municipality to Békés until 1954 when it became a village in the district with an independent council, from 1974 it became a completely independent village.

Geography
It covers an area of 57.45 km² and has a population of 773 people (2015).

References

Populated places in Békés County